Cheng Beng Buddhist Society, also the Vimalakirti Buddhist Centre, is a Buddhist monastery in Singapore. The foundation was originally set up by Venerable Wen Ming Hu. The present premises are located at Geylang, Singapore.

History
Cheng Beng Buddhist Society was founded as Singapore Buddhist Youth Group in 1961 by Wen Ming Hu and other lay Buddhists, and was renamed under its present name in 1962 when it was also relocated at an address offered by Chen Lu Niang. The society was named after the Buddhist bodhisattva Vimalakirti, a householder devotee of the ancient Shakyamuni Buddha.

Present Day
Building expansion took place from 2002 onwards which saw a six-story building completed.

On 4 March 2012 the present day name of Vimalakirti Buddhist Centre was adopted.

Occasional Buddhist workshops and services catering towards the lay Buddhist community are offered on its premises. The centre also hosts the Cakkavala Meditation Centre.

See also
Buddhism in Singapore

References

External links

Buddhist organizations
Buddhist temples in Singapore
Geylang
Religious organizations established in 1961